This is a List of Android launchers, which presents the main view of the device and is responsible for starting other apps and hosting live widgets.

References 

Launchers
Google lists
Lists of mobile apps
Lists of software
Mobile application launchers